Francesco Dibenedetto (10 March 1941 – 6 August 2021) was an Italian football manager. He won promotion to Serie B with Matera. He also managed Casarano, Fasano, Bisceglie and Altamura.

References

1941 births
2021 deaths
Italian football managers
Matera Calcio managers
People from Altamura
Sportspeople from the Metropolitan City of Bari